A by-election was held for the New South Wales Legislative Assembly electorate of Kiama on 13 January 1887 because of the resignation of Harman Tarrant, due to the pressures of his professional practice as a surgeon.

Dates

Candidates
This by-election was at the emergence of political parties in New South Wales. Both candidates were supporters of free trade, with Sir Henry Parkes campaigning in support of Angus Cameron. Bruce Smith similarly supported free trade principles, but was of a more independent mind, stating at the nomination that he would not "follow blindly the lead of Sir Henry Parkes or that of any other gentleman".

Results

Harman Tarrant resigned.

Aftermath
Cameron took his seat in the Legislative Assembly on 18 January, however his term was short-lived as Parliament was dissolved on 26 January. Cameron was re-elected unopposed at the election on 9 February as a  candidate.

See also
Electoral results for the district of Kiama
List of New South Wales state by-elections

References

1887 elections in Australia
New South Wales state by-elections
1880s in New South Wales